Mono is a Native American language of the Numic group of Uto-Aztecan languages, the ancestral language of the Mono people. Mono consists of two dialects, Eastern and Western.  The name "Monachi" is commonly used in reference to Western Mono and "Owens Valley Paiute" in reference to Eastern Mono. In 1925, Alfred Kroeber estimated that Mono had 3,000 to 4,000 speakers. , only about 40 elderly people spoke Mono as their first language. It is classified as critically endangered by UNESCO. It is spoken in the southern Sierra Nevada, the Mono Basin, and the Owens Valley of central-eastern California. Mono is most closely related to Northern Paiute; these two are classified as the Western group of the Numic branch of the Uto-Aztecan language family.

Western Mono

The number of Native speakers in 1994 ranged from 37 to 41. The majority of speakers are from the Northfork Rancheria and the community of Auberry. The Big Sandy Rancheria and Dunlap have from 12 to 14 speakers. The Northfork Mono are developing a dictionary, and both they and the Big Sandy Rancheria provide language classes. While not all are completely fluent, about 100 members of Northfork have "some command of the language." In the late 1950s, Lamb compiled a dictionary and grammar of Northfork Mono. The Western Mono language has a number of Spanish loanwords dating to the period of Spanish colonization of the Californias, as well as loanwords from Yokuts and Miwok

Owens Valley Paiute
In the mid-1990s, an estimated 50 people spoke the Owens Valley Paiute language, also known as Eastern Mono. Informal language classes exist and singers keep native language songs alive. Linguist Sydney Lamb studied this language in the 1950s and proposed the name Paviotso, but that was not widely adopted.

Phonemes
Below is given the phoneme inventory of Northfork Western Mono as presented by Lamb (1958).

Vowels

Consonants

Suprasegmental
Lamb (1958) also described four suprasegmental features that he ascribed phonemic status.

Morphology
Mono is an agglutinative language, in which words use suffix complexes for a variety of purposes with several morphemes strung together.

See also
Mono traditional narratives

References

Sources
Hinton, Leanne. Flutes of Fire: Essays on California Indian Languages. Berkeley: Heyday Books, 1994. .
Miller, Wick R. "Numic Languages." Handbook of North American Indians: Great Basin, Volume 11. Washington, DC: Smithsonian Institution, 1986. .

Further reading

Language revitalization

External links

Mono language overview at the Survey of California and Other Indian Languages

OLAC resources in and about the Mono language

Mono tribe
Agglutinative languages
Numic languages
Indigenous languages of California
Indigenous languages of the North American Great Basin
Endangered Uto-Aztecan languages
Native American language revitalization